Events in the year 1693 in Spain.

Incumbents
Monarch: Charles II

Events
founding of the Real Academia de Medicina y Cirugía de Sevilla (Royal Academy of Medicine and Surgery of Seville)

Births

Deaths

 
1690s in Spain